Isostola is a genus of moths in the family Erebidae described by Felder in 1874.

Species
 Isostola albiplaga Hering, 1925
 Isostola dilatata Hering, 1925
 Isostola divisa Walker, 1854
 Isostola flavicollaris Hering, 1925
 Isostola nigrivenata Hering, 1925
 Isostola philomela Druce, 1893
 Isostola rhodobroncha Felder, 1874
 Isostola tenebrata Hering, 1925
 Isostola thabena Dognin, 1919
 Isostola vicina Butler, 1876

Former species
 Isostola superba Druce, 1885

References

External links

Arctiinae
Moth genera